Liam Bertazzo (born 17 February 1992) is an Italian racing cyclist, who currently rides for UCI Continental team . He rode at the 2014 UCI Road World Championships. He was named in the start list for the 2016 Giro d'Italia.

Major results

Road

2009
 2nd Trofeo San Rocco
2012
 9th Circuito del Porto
2013
 2nd Circuito del Porto
2014
 1st Stage 1 Tour de Serbie
 3rd Gran Premio della Liberazione
 4th Circuito del Porto
 7th Road race, UEC European Under-23 Road Championships
2016
 6th Dwars door het Hageland
2017
 1st  Overall Tour of China I
1st  Points classification
1st Stage 2
 6th Heistse Pijl
 7th La Popolarissima
2020
 3rd  Team relay, UEC European Road Championships

Grand Tour general classification results timeline

Track

2009
 National Junior Championships
1st  Points race
1st  Team pursuit
2010
 1st  Team pursuit, National Junior Championships
 2nd  Team pursuit, UEC European Junior Championships
2011
 3rd Madison (with Omar Bertazzo), National Championships
2012
 National Championships
2nd Scratch
3rd Madison (with Omar Bertazzo)
 3rd  Team pursuit, UEC European Championships
2013
 1st  Madison (with Elia Viviani), UEC European Championships
2014
 2nd  Points race, UEC European Championships
 National Championships
2nd Points race
3rd Individual pursuit
2015
 2nd  Madison (with Elia Viviani), UCI World Championships
2016
 2nd  Team pursuit, UEC European Championships
 2nd Omnium, National Championships
2017
 1st  Team pursuit, UCI World Cup, Pruszków
 2nd  Team pursuit, UEC European Championships
 3rd  Team pursuit, UCI World Championships
2018
 1st  Team pursuit, UEC European Championships
 1st Six Days of Fiorenzuola (with Francesco Lamon)
 3rd  Team pursuit, UCI World Championships
2019
 2nd  Team pursuit, European Games
2021
 1st  Team pursuit, UCI World Championships

References

External links
 
 
 
 
 
 
 

1992 births
Living people
Italian male cyclists
Italian track cyclists
Cyclists from the Province of Padua
Olympic cyclists of Italy
Cyclists at the 2016 Summer Olympics
European Championships (multi-sport event) gold medalists
European Games medalists in cycling
European Games silver medalists for Italy
Cyclists at the 2019 European Games
UCI Track Cycling World Champions (men)
21st-century Italian people